Liman is a village in the Kemalpaşa District, Artvin Province, Turkey. Its population is 173 (2021). Most villagers are ethnically Laz.

References

Villages in Kemalpaşa District
Laz settlements in Turkey